The 1985 Shell Azodrin Bugbusters season was the first season of the franchise in the Philippine Basketball Association (PBA).

New team
Pilipinas Shell Corporation bought out the lock, stock and barrel of the famed Crispa Redmanizers, the winningest ballclub which disbanded as the league enters its 11th season. The newest member to be known as Shell Chemicals or Shell Azodrin retained only four Redmanizers namely Philip Cezar, Bernie Fabiosa, Arturo Cristobal and Willie Pearson. They were able to acquire three-time MVP William Adornado from Great Taste when they traded the 1984 Rookie of the year Willie Pearson in exchange. 

Shell got six rookies who were amateur standouts, three of them were former PABL MVPs, 6-5 center Sonny Cabatu, the two-time PABL MVP and the pro league's number one overall pick in the first-ever rookie draft, 1983 PABL Founders Cup MVP Manuel Luis Marquez, a 1984 youth campaigner, and 1984 PABL Ambassador's Cup MVP Leo Austria, a 1982 RP Youth stalwart. Their other three top-rated rookies were Romeo Ang, Aldo Perez and Menardo Jubinal.

Former Yco amateur team coach Freddie Webb, who last coached the Tanduay team in 1983 and who wound up as Vintage panelist in the previous year was Shell's choice to call the shots for the Bugbusters, which got their monicker through the megahit film Ghostbusters. Shell opened their first conference campaign with Kevin Graham as its import, they lost their first two games and Graham was replaced by the returning, former N-Rich and SMB import Rich Adams.

Finals stint
The Shell Bugbusters played in the PBA finals in only their second participated tournament during the All-Filipino Conference. They lost to defending champion Great Taste Coffee Makers in four games of the best-of-five title playoffs.

Awards
Bogs Adornado made it to the Mythical five selection as he finish second to eventual MVP winner Ricardo Brown of Great Taste in the race for the Most Valuable Player trophy. 
Leo Austria won the season's Rookie of the year honors.

Notable dates
August 11: Shell outscored Ginebra in the final period to pull away with an 89-76 victory in a playoff for the right to meet Great Taste Coffee Makers for the All-Filipino championship. 
 
September 19: Bogs Adornado scored 41 points and import Howard "Hi-C" Carter tossed in 40 points for a combined 81-point output as Shell beats Northern, 106-104, for their first win in the Third Conference after three straight losses. Carter played his last game and was gonna be replaced by Lester Rowe.

Roster

Subtraction

Imports

References

Shell Turbo Chargers seasons
Shell